Stan Trick may refer to:
 Stanley Arthur Trick (1884–1958), English cricketer for Essex
 William Mervyn Stanley Trick (1916–1995), Welsh cricketer for Glamorgan